Gajarajan Kongad Kuttisankaran ( 1962 — 26 July 2020) was an elephant that lived in Kongad, Palakkad, Kerala. He is one among the few native elephants born in Kerala to have a height of more than 309 cm.

Kuttisankaran was born at the Nilambur Forest. After leaving the forest at a very young age, he was offered to the Kongad Thirumandhamkunnu temple in 1969. He has won the titles of Adyan Thampuran, Ibhakula Chakravarti and Gajarajan. Kuttisankaran was one of the most famous elephants in the folklore of Kerala. According to experts from Madangasastram, he was characterized by 18 claws, a protruding trunk, a long tail and beautiful eyes.  

Kuttisankaran was a regular at festivals including Thrissur Pooram, Nemmara Vela, Puthussery Vedi and Mannarkkad Pooram. Kuttisankaran last participated in the Mannarkkad Pooram after which he went to treatment for age related problems and months later, he died on 26 July 2020.

See also
 List of individual elephants

References

1962 animal births
2020 animal deaths
Individual elephants
Elephants in Indian culture
Individual animals in India
Elephants in Hinduism
Elephants in Kerala